Le Pin (French meaning "the pine") is a commune in the Charente-Maritime department in the Nouvelle-Aquitaine region in southwestern France. Le Pin is the least populated commune in the canton of Les Trois Monts.

Geography
The commune is traversed by the Seugne river.

Population

See also
 Communes of the Charente-Maritime department

References

External links
 

Communes of Charente-Maritime
Charente-Maritime communes articles needing translation from French Wikipedia